Christopher Cairns (born 21 June 1957) is an Australian competitive sailor and Olympic medalist. He won a bronze medal in the Tornado class at the 1984 Summer Olympics in Los Angeles.

References

External links
 
 
 

1957 births
Living people
Australian male sailors (sport)
Sailors at the 1984 Summer Olympics – Tornado
Olympic sailors of Australia
Olympic bronze medalists for Australia
Olympic medalists in sailing
Tornado class world champions
World champions in sailing for Australia
Medalists at the 1984 Summer Olympics
20th-century Australian people